W16DS-D, known on-air as WAY-TV, is a low-powered religious station based and licensed in Birmingham, Alabama, owned and operated by the Glen Iris Baptist Church, who also owns WGIB radio. The station broadcasts on digital UHF channel 16.

The station carries additional religious programming, as well as some secular programming including  The Beverly Hillbillies.

At various times, WAY TV rebroadcast the audio from WGIB-FM, with an in-studio camera showing the announcer while they are speaking and scenes of nature airing while music is playing. With the transition to digital broadcasting in 2015, the WGIB audio and nature scenes were moved full-time to channel 47.2, while the primary channel now airs a separate gospel music feed during non-programmed hours.

WAY TV was relayed on W15AZ, a low-powered relay on channel 15 in Alabaster, Alabama. W15AZ's license was surrendered to the Federal Communications Commission and cancelled on July 14, 2021.

External links

16DS-D
Television channels and stations established in 1990
Low-power television stations in the United States
1990 establishments in Alabama